Zhang Li (born 14 January 1963) is a former Chinese speed skater who participated in the 1980 Winter Olympics where she finished in 31st at the 1000 metres race.

Reference

Chinese female speed skaters
1963 births
Living people
Olympic speed skaters of China
Speed skaters at the 1980 Winter Olympics